Larry Sherrer (born January 1, 1950) is a former American football running back who played two seasons in the Canadian Football League with the Montreal Alouettes and BC Lions. He first enrolled at the University of Oklahoma before transferring to the University of Hawaii at Manoa.

College career

University of Oklahoma
Sherrer first played college football for the Oklahoma Sooners.

University of Hawaii at Manoa
Sherrer transferred to play for the Hawaii Rainbow Warriors from 1969 to 1971. He played in the Hula Bowl in 1971 and was an honorable mention small school All-American. He became the first player in the school's history to rush for more than 1,000 yards in a season, finished his career as the Rainbow Warriors' career leader in rushing and scoring. Sherrer also participated in track and field for the Rainbow Warriors. He was inducted into the University of Hawai‘i Sports Circle of Honor.

Professional career

Montreal Alouettes
Sherrer signed with the Montreal Alouettes in 1973 but suffered an injury that caused him to miss the 1973 season. He played in three games for the Alouettes in 1974 and scored the team's only touchdown of the 1974 Grey Cup as the Alouettes beat the Edmonton Eskimos 20-7. He missed the entire 1975 season due to a severe pelvic injury.

BC Lions
Sherrer played for the BC Lions in 1976.

References

External links
Just Sports Stats
College stats
totalfootballstats.com

Living people
1950 births
American football running backs
Canadian football running backs
American players of Canadian football
Oklahoma Sooners football players
Hawaii Rainbow Warriors football players
Montreal Alouettes players
BC Lions players